Things That Go Bump may refer to:

 Things That Go Bump (plays), a 2008 trilogy of plays by Alan Ayckbourn
 "Things That Go Bump", a 2007 episode from The Dresden Files
 "Things That Go Bump", a 2007 episode from Shaun the Sheep
 "Things That Go Bump", a 2004 episode from Powers

See also
 Things That Go Bump in the Night (disambiguation)